Kasey Marie Cooper (born April 7, 1995) is an American softball player and third baseman, originally from Dothan, Alabama.  Cooper played college ball at Auburn University, in which entering her senior season holds almost every offensive record for the Tigers.  Cooper also plays for the United States women's national softball team, and won a gold medal with the team at the 2016 Women's Softball World Championship and a Silver Medal at the 2016 World Cup of Softball.

Early life
Cooper was born in Dothan, Alabama to parents Jeff and Peppi Cooper.  Cooper's older sister, Kortney, played college ball at Troy University.  Cooper attended Dothan High School and graduated in 2013.  Cooper hit .569 with 22 home runs, 77 RBI and pitched with a 28-13 record, 1.35 ERA and 392 strikeouts from the circle as a senior.

Auburn Tigers
After graduating from high school, Cooper attended Auburn University, from where she graduated in May of 2017. Cooper owns records in home runs, RBIs, batting average, and on-base percentage.  Cooper was named co-NFCA National Freshman of the Year in 2014, along with Tennessee's Annie Aldrete, was the SEC Player of the Year in 2016, and was a First Team All-American in 2015 and 2016.

Stats

International career
Cooper was selected to play for the United States women's national softball team in 2016 and 2017.  Cooper won a silver medal at the 2016 World Cup of Softball and a gold medal at the 2016 Women's Softball World Championship with the team.

Stats

References

1995 births
Living people
Auburn Tigers softball players
Scrap Yard Dawgs players
Sportspeople from Dothan, Alabama
Softball players from Alabama